Doomsday Book may refer to:
 Domesday Book or Doomsday Book, an 11th-century survey of England
 Doomsday Book (novel), a 1992 novel by Connie Willis
 Doomsday Book (film), a 2012 science-fiction anthology film directed by Kim Jee-woon and Yim Pil-sung

See also
 Domesday Book (disambiguation)
 Doomsday (disambiguation)